Adam Blake (born Adam John Blake, 25 January 1976, Reading, Berkshire, England) is an English producer, musician and songwriter, best known as a founder member of the electronic music band Zoot Woman. He produces remixes under the aliases Paper Faces (with Stuart Price), Sloop John Barillo, and Mad March Hare. Paper Faces have reworked tracks for Zoot Woman as well as other established recording artists such as Madonna, Scissor Sisters, Armand Van Helden, Chromeo and Frankmusik. He has worked on records for artists such as Pet Shop Boys, Duffy, Seal and Kylie Minogue. In an interview with Universal Audio, he discusses recording techniques.

Discography

Albums

Singles
From Star Climbing
 2014 – Coming Up For Air
 2014 – Don't Tear Yourself Apart
 2013 – The Stars Are Bright
From Things Are What They Used To Be
 2010 – More Than Ever
 2009 – Memory
 2009 – Just A Friend of Mine
 2009 – We Won't Break (Redone)/Saturation
 2008 – Live in My Head
 2007 – We Won't Break
From Zoot Woman
 2004 – Taken It All
 2003 – Gem
 2003 – Grey Day
From Living in a Magazine
 2001 – Living in a Magazine
 2001 – You & I
 2000 – It's Automatic
Non-Album Single
 1997 – Chasing Cities

Remixography

References

External links
Zoot Woman official website
Zoot Woman on discogs.com
Adam Blake on discogs.com

1976 births
Living people
English songwriters
English electronic musicians
English dance musicians
English pop musicians
English record producers
Musicians from Berkshire
People from Reading, Berkshire
Remixers